The Balumtun Sandstone is a geologic formation in Chiapas, Mexico. The formation is up to 760 metres thick, and consists of gray sandstone, that were deposited during the Upper Aquitanian stage of the Early Miocene.

See also 
 List of fossiliferous stratigraphic units in Mexico
 Mexican amber

References

Further reading 
 M. d. C. Perrilliat, F. J. Vega, and M. A. Coutiño. 2010. Miocene mollusks from the Simojovel area in Chiapas, southwestern Mexico. Journal of South American Earth Sciences 30:111-119
 S. D. Webb, B. L. Beatty, and G. Poinar, Jr. 2003. New evidence of Miocene Protoceratidae including a new species from Chiapas, Mexico. Bulletin of the American Museum of Natural History 279:348-367

Geologic formations of Mexico
Neogene Mexico
Aquitanian (stage)
Sandstone formations
Conglomerate formations
Lagerstätten